Nosy Varika is a district of Vatovavy in Madagascar. The district has a population of 276,887 in 2018.

Communes
The district is further divided into 19 communes. The postal code for the district is 319.

 Ambahy
 Ambakobe
 Ambodiara
 Ambodilafa
 Ambodirian I Sahafary
 Ampasinambo
 Andara
 Androrangovola
 Angodogodona
 Antanambao
 Befody
 Fanivelona
 Fiadanana
 Nosy Varika
 Sahavato
 Soavina Est
 Vohilava
 Vohindroa
 Vohitrandriana

References 

Districts of Vatovavy